Tanytarsini is a tribe of midges in the non-biting midge family (Chironomidae).

Genera & species
 Genus Afrozavrelia Harrison, 2004
A. kribiensis (Kieffer, 1923)
 Genus Cladotanytarsus Kieffer, 1921
C. amandus Hirvenoja, 1962
C. atridorsum Kieffer, 1924
C. australomancus Glover, 1973	
C. bicornuta Kieffer, 1922
C. bilinearis Glover, 1973 
C. conversus (Johannsen, 1932)
C. crusculus (Saether, 1971)
C. cyrylae Gilka, 2001
C. difficilis Brundin, 1947
C. dispersopilosus (Goetghebuer, 1935)
C. furcatus (Freeman, 1961)  
C. gedanicus Gilka, 2001
C. iucundus Hirvenoja, 1962
C. lepidocalcar Kieffer, 1938
C. lewisi Freeman, 1950
C. mancus (Walker, 1856)
C. matthei Gilka, 2001
C. molestus Hirvenoja, 1962
C. nigrovittatus (Goetghebuer, 1922)
C. pallidus Kieffer, 1922
C. pseudomancus (Goetghebuer, 1934)
C. tasmanicus Glover, 1973 
C. teres Hirvenoja, 1962
C. unilinearis Glover, 1973 
C. vanderwulpi (Edwards, 1929)
C. viridiventris (Malloch, 1915)
C. wexionensis Brundin, 1947
 Genus Constempellina Brundin, 1947
C. bita Pankratova, 1983
C. brevicosta (Edwards, 1937)
 Genus Corynocera Zetterstedt, 1838
C. ambigua Zetterstedt, 1837
C. oliveri Lindeberg, 1970
 Genus Micropsectra Kieffer, 1909
M. apposita (Walker, 1856)
M. aristata Pinder, 1976
M. atrofasciata (Kieffer, 1911)
M. attenuata Reiss, 1969
M. auvergnensis Reiss, 1969
M. bidentata (Goetghebuer, 1921)
M. bodanica Reiss, 1969
M. borealis (Kieffer, 1922)
M. brundini Sawedal, 1979
M. bryanti Hardy, 1960
M. clastrieri Reiss, 1969
M. connexa (Kieffer, 1906)
M. contracta Reiss, 1965
M. deflecta (Johannsen, 1905)
M. dives (Johannsen, 1905)
M. freyi Storå, 1945
M. fusca (Meigen, 1804)
M. groenlandica Søgaard Andersen, 1937
M. hawaiiensis Hardy, 1960
M. insignilobus Kieffer, 1924
M. junci (Meigen, 1818)
M. kaalae Hardy, 1960
M. lacustris Säwedal, 1975
M. lindebergi Säwedal, 1976
M. lindrothi Goetghebuer, 1931
M. logani (Johannsen, 1928)
M. miki Marcuzzi, 1950
M. nigripila (Johannsen, 1905)
M. notescens (Walker, 1856)
M. pharetrophora Fittkau & Reiss, 1999
M. polita (Malloch, 1919)
M. radialis Goetghebuer, 1939
M. recurvata Goetghebuer, 1928
M. rilensis Gilka, 2001
M. roseiventris (Kieffer, 1909)
M. sedna (Oliver, 1976)
M. seguyi Casas & Laville, 1990
M. subnitens Goetghebuer, 1928
M. tori Sawedal, 1981
M. xantha (Roback, 1955)
 Genus Neozavrelia Goetghebuer, 1941
N. bowmani Cranston, 1998
N. fuldensis Fittkau, 1954  
N. longappendiculata Albu, 1980  
N. luteola Goetghebuer & Thienemann, 1941
N. mongolensis Reiss, 1971
N. optoputealis Cranston, 1998
 Genus Parapsectra Reiss, 1969
 Genus Paratanytarsus Thienemann & Bause, 1913
P. bituberculatus (Edwards, 1929)
P. confusus Palmén, 1960
P. dimorphis Reiss, 1965
P. dissimilis (Johannsen, 1905)
P. dubius (Malloch, 1915)
P. inopertus (Walker, 1856)
P. intricatus (Goetghebuer, 1921)
P. kaszabi Reiss, 1971
P. laccophilus (Edwards, 1929)
P. lauterborni (Kieffer, 1909)
P. natvigi (Goetghebuer, 1933
P. parthenogeneticus (Freeman, 1961)
P. penicillatus (Goetghebuer, 1928)
P. setosimanus (Goetghebuer, 1933)
P. similatus (Malloch, 1915)
P. tenuis (Meigen, 1830)
 Genus Rheotanytarsus Thienemann & Bause, 1913
R. akrina (Roback, 1960)
R. distinctissimus (Brundin, 1947)
R. exiguus (Johannsen, 1905)
R. exiguus Johannsen, 1905
R. muscicola Thienemann, 1929
R. pellucidus (Walker, 1848)
R. photophilus Goetghebuer, 1921
 Genus Stempellina Thienemann & Bause, 1913
S. almi Brundin, 1947
S. australiensis Freeman, 1961
S. bausei Kieffer, 1911
S. chambiensis Goetghebuer, 1935
S. johannsenii (Thienemann and Bause, 1913)
S. leptocelloides Webb, 1969
S. ranota Webb, 1969
S. rodesta Webb, 1969
 Genus Stempellinella Brundin, 1947
S. brevis (Edwards, 1929)
S. minor (Edwards, 1929)
S. saltuum (Goetghebuer, 1921)
 Genus Tanytarsus van der Wulp, 1874
T. aberrans Lindeberg, 1970
T. aculeatus Brundin, 1949
T. anderseni Fittkau & Reiss, 1971
T. bathophilus Kieffer, 1911
T. bathyphilus (Kieffer, 1911)
T. brundini Lindeberg, 1963
T. buchonius Reiss & Fittkau, 1971
T. chinyensis Goetghebuer, 1934
T. cretensis Reiss, 1987
T. curticornis Kieffer, 1911
T. debilis (Meigen, 1830)
T. dibranchius Kieffer, 1926
T. dispar Lindeberg, 1967
T. ejuncidus (Walker, 1856)
T. eminulus (Walker, 1856)
T. excavatus Edwards, 1929
T. fennicus  Lindeberg, 1970
T. fimbriatus Reiss & Fittkau, 1971
T. formosanus Kieffer, 1912
T. gibbosiceps Kieffer, 1922
T. glabrescens Edwards, 1929
T. gracilentus (Holmgren, 1883)
T. gregarius Kieffer, 1909
T. gregarius gr. (Kieffer, 1909)
T. heusdensis Goetghebuer, 1923
T. inaequalis Goetghebuer, 1921
T. innarensis Brundin, 1947
T. lactescens Edwards, 1929
T. lapponicus  Lindeberg, 1970
T. latiforceps Edwards, 1941
T. lestagei Goetghebuer, 1922
T. longitarsis Kieffer, 1911
T. lugens (Kieffer in Thienemann & Kieffer, 1916)
T. mancospinosus Ekrem & Reiss, 1999
T. medius Reiss & Fittkau, 1971
T. mendax Kieffer, 1925
T. miriforceps (Kieffer, 1921)
T. mongolneous Sasa and Suzuki, 1997
T. mongolopeus Sasa and Suzuki, 1997
T. multipunctatus Brundin, 1947
T. nemorosus Edwards, 1929
T. niger Andersen, 1937
T. nigricollis Goetghebuer, 1939
T. norvegicus (Kieffer, 1924)
T. occultus Brundin, 1949
T. palettaris Vernaux, 1969
T. pallidicornis (Walker, 1856)
T. pallidicornis (Stephens in Walker, 1856)
T. palmeni Lindeberg, 1967
T. pseudolestagei Shilova, 1976
T. quadridentatus Brundin, 1947
T. recurvatus Brundin, 1947
T. signatus (van der Wulp, 1858)
T. simulans Lindeberg, 1967
T. sinuatus Goetghebuer, 1936
T. smolandicus Brundin, 1947
T. striatulus Lindeberg, 1976
T. sylvaticus (van der Wulp, 1858)
T. telmaticus Lindeberg, 1959
T. tika (Tourenq, 1975)
T. usmaensis Pagast, 1931
T. verralli Goetghebuer, 1928
T. volgensis Miseiko, 1967
 Genus Virgatanytarsus Pinder, 1982
V. arduennensis (Goetghebuer, 1922)
V. triangularis (Goetghebuer, 1928)
 Genus Zavrelia Kieffer, 1913
Z. aristata Torbjørn & Stur, 2009
Z. casasi Torbjørn & Stur, 2009
Z. clinovolsella Guo & Wang, 2004
Z. hudsoni Torbjørn & Stur, 2009
Z. pentatoma Kieffer & Bause in Bause, 1914
Z. sinica Torbjørn & Stur, 2009
Z. tusimatijea (Sasa & Suzuki, 1999)

References

Chironomidae
Nematocera tribes